Rihards  Bukarts (born 31 December 1995) is a Latvian professional ice hockey forward. He is currently playing for EC KAC in the ICE Hockey League (ICEHL). Bukarts was selected 9th overall in the 2012 KHL Junior Draft by the Dinamo Riga. 
With the selection, Bukarts became the highest-drafted Latvian in KHL history, four spots higher than his brother Roberts Bukarts in 2009.

Playing career
Bukarts is youngest player ever who score  in MHL on 15 September 2011  On 2 July 2012 Rihards Bukarts signed with Dinamo Riga two-way contract. Bukarts was selected 7th overall in the 2013 CHL Import Draft by Brandon Wheat Kings (WHL).

Bukarts was the highest-drafted player in Wheat Kings' history. In the summer of 2013, Bukarts broke contract with Dinamo Riga and left for North America to play for the Brandon Wheat Kings of the Western Hockey League. He officially signed a contract on 19 July 2013 with the major junior team. In his first season in North America in 2013–14, Bukarts in 65 games scored (28) goals (WHL Most Goals by Rookie) and gave 26 assists.

In the following 2014–15 season, he featured in 62 games, scoring (33) goals totalling the most goals scored by a European player in the team's history (single-season record) as well as adding 41 assists. On February 8, 2015, Bukarts was named Denny's WHL Player of the Week. Bukarted helped the Wheat Kings reach the WHL finals in the post-season, suffering defeat against the Kelowna Rockets. In 16 playoff games, Bukarts scored 4 goals and 18 points.

Undrafted, Bukarts accepted a try-out over the summer to attend the 2015 NHL training camp of the Edmonton Oilers. After his release from the Oilers, Bukarts returned to the Wheat Kings for the 2015–16 season before he was traded to the Portland Winterhawks on 29 October 2015. On December 14, 2015, Rihards Bukarts was named 2nd time in his career as the WHL player of the Week. In 55 games with the Winterhawks, Bukarts amassed 53 points. At the conclusion of his major junior career, Bukarts joined the Portland Pirates of the AHL, an affiliate to the Florida Panthers, on an amateur try-out basis to complete the season. He recorded an assist in a solitary game.

Bukarts attended the Panthers' rookie camp after signing a one-year deal with the Panthers' inaugural AHL affiliate, the Springfield Thunderbirds. After attending Florida's main training camp, before he was reassigned to begin the 2016–17 season with the Thunderbirds. He split the season between Springfield and the ECHL with the Manchester Monarchs.

As a free agent in the following off-season, Bukarts returned to Europe in agreeing to an initial one-year contract with HC Zlin of the Czech Extraliga on August 21, 2017. In the 2017–18 season, Bukarts left the Czech Republic after 17 games, making appearances in the Kontinental Hockey League with Dinamo Riga before completing the season with German club, Eisbären Berlin of the DEL.

Bukarts opted to continue in the DEL as a free agent, agreeing to a one-year deal with Schwenninger Wild Wings on July 13, 2018. In the 2018–19 season, Bukarts contributed with 22 points through 42 games, unable to help the Wild Wings progress to the post-season. At the completion of the season, Bukarts left Schwenninger at the conclusion of his contract.

On May 13, 2019, Bukarts secured a one-year contract to continue in the DEL with Düsseldorfer EG.

International play
Bukarts participated at the 2012 and 2013 IIHF World U18 Championships and also 2013 IIHF World U20 Championships he was a member of the Latvia men's national junior ice hockey team. He finished with the most penalty minutes in the tournament.

Career statistics

Regular season and playoffs

International

References

External links 

 Rihards Bukart's MHL profile

1995 births
Living people
Admiral Vladivostok players
Brandon Wheat Kings players
Dinamo Riga players
Düsseldorfer EG players
Eisbären Berlin players
EC KAC players
Latvian ice hockey forwards
People from Jūrmala
HK Riga players
Kapitan Stupino players
Manchester Monarchs (ECHL) players
Portland Pirates players
Portland Winterhawks players
Schwenninger Wild Wings players
Springfield Thunderbirds players
PSG Berani Zlín players
Ice hockey players at the 2022 Winter Olympics
Olympic ice hockey players of Latvia
Latvian expatriate sportspeople in the United States
Latvian expatriate sportspeople in Canada
Latvian expatriate sportspeople in the Czech Republic
Latvian expatriate sportspeople in Germany
Latvian expatriate sportspeople in Russia
Latvian expatriate sportspeople in Austria
Expatriate ice hockey players in the United States
Expatriate ice hockey players in Canada
Expatriate ice hockey players in the Czech Republic
Expatriate ice hockey players in Germany
Expatriate ice hockey players in Russia
Expatriate ice hockey players in Austria
Latvian expatriate ice hockey people